Poulson may refer to:

 Poulson (surname)
 Poulson, Virginia
 Poulson (processor), the codename of Intel's Itanium 9500 processor series

See also
 Polson (disambiguation)